Corning School District is a public school district based in Corning, Arkansas, United States. The school district encompasses  of land, including portions of Clay County and Randolph County. Clay County communities include Corning, Datto, Knobel, McDougal, and Success. Randolph County communities include Reyno and almost all of Biggers. Peach Orchard is not in the Corning district, but is in an exclave of the Greene County Tech School District, and an enclave of the Corning district.

The district provides comprehensive education for more than 1,050 prekindergarten through grade 12 students and is accredited by the Arkansas Department of Education (ADE) and AdvancED.

History 
The Knobel School District consolidated with the Corning School District on July 1, 1985.

In May 2004, the former Biggers–Reyno School District consolidated with the Corning School District. The consolidation became effective July 1 of that year.

Schools 
 Corning High School, located in Corning and serving more than 450 students in grades 7 through 12
 Central Elementary School, located in Corning and serving more than 300 students in grades 3 through 6
 Park Elementary School, located in Corning and serving more than 275 students in prekindergarten through grade 2

References

Further reading
Includes boundaries of predecessor districts:
 2004-2005 School District Map
 Map of Arkansas School Districts pre-July 1, 2004
 (Download)
 (Download)

External links 
 

School districts in Arkansas
Education in Clay County, Arkansas
Education in Randolph County, Arkansas